Lychas ceylonensis is a species of scorpion in the family Buthidae. It is endemic to Sri Lanka. The name is derived from the old name of Sri Lanka (Ceylon). The species has similarities with Lychas srilankensis, but can be differentiated by physical differences and differing habitats: L. srilankensis coming from a humid regions, whereas L. ceylonensis comes from dry formations closer to the center of the island.

References

ceylonensis
Animals described in 1999
Scorpions of Asia
Endemic fauna of Sri Lanka